The somoni (ISO 4217 code: TJS; abbreviation:SM) is the currency of Tajikistan. It is subdivided into 100 dirams.

History
The somoni was introduced on 30 October 2000, replacing the rouble, at the rate of SM 1 = 1,000 Rbls.

One somoni is divided into 100 dirams. Diram banknotes were first introduced on 30 October 2000, and coins were later introduced in 2001 with the intention of creating a more efficient monetary system and gradually replacing the diram notes. This was also the first time circulating coins were used in Tajikistan since independence in 1991.

Coins
Circulation coins, first issued in 2001, were struck in denominations of 5, 10, 20, 25, and 50 dirams composed of brass-clad steel and SM 1, SM 3, and SM 5 struck in nickel-clad steel. Bimetallic SM 3 and SM 5 coins were first released in 2003. The reverses of all somoni coins are changed annually and commemorate various events. A second issue dated 2011 was issued in June 2012, and included 1, 2, 5, 10, 20, and 50 dirams and SM 1. A third series of somoni coins was issued in 2018 in denominations of SM 1, SM 3 and SM 5.

Tajikistan coins are struck by Goznak at the Saint Petersburg Mint in Russia.

Remarks
 "ҷумҳурии Тоҷикистон" = "Republic of Tajikistan"
Standard Catalog of World Coins: 1901–present, 31st ed. states that the composition for SM 1, SM 3, and SM 5 is cupronickel-zinc, while the Central Bank states cupronickel.
 "Рӯдакӣ" = "Rudaki"

Third series (2018)
A third series of somoni coins was issued in 2018 in denominations of SM 1, SM 3 and SM 5.

Banknotes
Banknotes of 1, 5, 20, and 50 dirams, SM 1, SM 5, SM 10, SM 20, SM 50, and SM 100 were printed in 1999 and issued in 2000. Along with a SM 3 note in 2010, inflationary pressure since the introduction of the somoni resulted in the issuing of SM 200 and SM 500 somoni notes that year. The SM 5, SM 10, SM 20, SM 50, and SM 100 somoni notes were reissued in 2013, bearing the year 1999. In 2021, the National Bank of Tajikistan issued a SM 100 banknote, similar to the original issue, but now featuring an image of the Navruz Palace on the back side of the note, replacing the image of the Presidential Palace on the previous issues of the denomination.

See also
Economy of Tajikistan

References
Notes

Sources

External links
 

Currencies introduced in 2000
Economy of Tajikistan
2000 establishments in Tajikistan